Plunders Creek is a stream in Hickman and Dickson counties, Tennessee, in the United States.

Plunders Creek was named for "Old Plunder", a hunting dog who was killed by a bear near the creek.

See also
List of rivers of Tennessee

References

Rivers of Dickson County, Tennessee
Rivers of Hickman County, Tennessee
Rivers of Tennessee